Love Changes Things is a studio album by Ju-Taun released June 30, 2009.

Track listing
 "Go Slow"
 "Is It Love"
 "Get @ Me"
 "Let Me In (LCT Version)"
 "Chemistry "
 "Find My Way "
 "Why "
 "Its Alright "
 "Yes "
 "Change Your Mind "
 "Love Changes Things "
 "Es Amor "

2009 albums